Francis Burke (Dean of Elphin) (b Pellick Farm 1834 - d The Abbey, Boyle, Roscommon 19 February 1904) was a priest of the Church of Ireland.

Burke was born in County Cork and educated at Trinity College, Dublin. After curacies at Killaraght and Kilfree he was the Rector of Ardcane from 1874 to 1898. He was  Dean of Elphin from 1898 to 1904. Based on two lectures, he published Loch Ce and its Annals in 1895. http://www.askaboutireland.ie/reading-room/digital-book-collection/digital-books-by-county/roscommon/burke-loch-ce-and-its-ann/

Notes

Alumni of Trinity College Dublin
Deans of Elphin
19th-century Irish Anglican priests
20th-century Irish Anglican priests
People from County Cork